Tony Alexander Adams  (born 10 October 1966) is an English former football manager and player. Adams played for Arsenal and England, captaining both teams. He spent his entire playing career of 19 years as a centre back at Arsenal, making 672 total appearances. He is considered one of the greatest Arsenal players of all time by the club's own fans and was included in the Football League 100 Legends.

With Arsenal, he won four top flight division titles, uniquely captaining a title-winning team in three different decades,  three FA Cups, two Football League Cups, a UEFA Cup Winners' Cup, and two FA Community Shields. A statue honouring Adams was unveiled at Emirates stadium on 9 December 2011, along with statues of Thierry Henry and Herbert Chapman. He won 66 caps for England between 1987 and 2000 and played at four major tournaments.

When his playing career finished Adams went into football management, spending periods in charge of Wycombe Wanderers, Portsmouth, Azerbaijani side Gabala and Spanish side Granada.

Early life
Born in Romford, Adams grew up in Dagenham and was a pupil at Hunters Hall Primary School from 1971 to 1978 and then Eastbrook Comprehensive School from 1978 to 1983. His cousin is fellow professional footballer Steve MacKenzie.

Club career
Adams signed for Arsenal as a schoolboy in 1980. He made his first-team debut on 5 November 1983 against Sunderland in the First Division, four weeks after his 17th birthday. Adams became a regular player in the 1986–87 season, winning his first major trophy that season when playing in the Football League Cup Final win over Liverpool at Wembley.

Together with Lee Dixon, Nigel Winterburn and Steve Bould, Adams was part of the "famous back four" that lined up in Arsenal's defence, which under George Graham was renowned for its well-disciplined use of the offside trap. On 1 January 1988, he became Arsenal captain at the age of 21; he would remain club captain for the next 14 years until his retirement.

Adams's strong discipline of the defence was considered a factor in Arsenal winning the League Cup in 1986–87 and then the First Division championship twice; the first in 1988–89 after a win over Liverpool in the final game of the season; the second in 1990–91, losing once all season.

In 1992–93 Adams gained the distinction of being the captain of the first English side to win the League Cup and FA Cup double, lifting the European Cup Winners' Cup the following year.

Despite this success, a battle with alcoholism, which started in the mid-1980s, increasingly blighted his life as he was reportedly often involved in fights in nightclubs. On 6 May 1990, Adams crashed his Ford Sierra into a wall in Rayleigh and when breathalysed his blood alcohol level was found to be more than four times the legal drink-drive limit. On 19 December that year, at Southend Crown Court, he was sentenced to four months in prison, and freed after half of his sentence on 15 February 1991.
He became one of the most high-profile recovering alcoholics in the UK; his battle with alcohol is detailed in his autobiography, Addicted, which was released in May 1998 to enormous critical acclaim.

Six weeks into Adams's sobriety, Arsène Wenger arrived as Arsenal manager in October 1996. Adams reflected in 2020 that Wenger understood his psychology, and knew of the dangers of alcohol as his parents ran a pub. Adams rewarded his manager's understanding handsomely, captaining the club to two Premiership and FA Cup Doubles, in 1997–98 and 2001–02.

In August 2002, just before the start of the 2002–03 season, Adams retired from professional football after a career spanning almost 20 years, his last match being the 2002 FA Cup Final. He played 674 matches for Arsenal (only David O'Leary has played more) and was the most successful captain in the club's history. The number 6 shirt that Adams wore when playing was not used again until the 2006–07 season, when it was assigned to Philippe Senderos.

Just before his retirement as a player, Adams had applied to become manager of Brentford (who had just missed out on promotion to Division One) after the resignation of Steve Coppell, but his application was rejected.

Nicknamed "Mr Arsenal", he was honoured by Arsenal with a testimonial game against Celtic in May 2002 with many Arsenal legends playing, including Ian Wright, John Lukic and Adams's fellow back four stalwarts, Dixon, Winterburn and Bould. The game finished 1–1 with Lee Dixon, in his final appearance for the Gunners, getting their goal. In March 2003, just seven months after his retirement and with Arsenal BBC Sport named Adams as the former Arsenal player that the club would most benefit from returning.

In 2004, Adams was inducted into the English Football Hall of Fame in recognition of his impact on the English game, and in 2008 he was placed third in the 50 Greatest Gunners poll on the club's website.

A statue of Adams was placed outside Emirates Stadium in celebration of the club's 125th anniversary on 9 December 2011. Manager Herbert Chapman and Arsenal's all-time top goal scorer Thierry Henry and later Dennis Bergkamp were also immortalised with statues outside the ground.

International career

Adams made his debut for England against Spain in 1987, and played in UEFA Euro 1988. England lost all three games, but Adams scored one of England's two goals in the tournament in a 3–1 defeat to the Soviet Union. He was the first player to represent England who had been born after the 1966 World Cup win.

After a highly promising start to his international career, Adams suffered a series of setbacks during the early 1990s. He was surprisingly left out of the 1990 FIFA World Cup squad by manager Bobby Robson, missed UEFA Euro 1992 due to injury, whilst England failed to qualify for the 1994 FIFA World Cup. England reached the semi-finals of UEFA Euro 1996, before losing on penalties to Germany.

Adams appeared at the 1998 FIFA World Cup. Later that year, he made headlines for several statements in his autobiography Addicted, criticising manager Glenn Hoddle for his management of David Beckham and Paul Gascoigne, and for making Alan Shearer captain instead of Adams; he also called Gascoigne an alcoholic, which was denied by the player's representatives. Hoddle told the press that he had no problems with Adams's opinions from the book. 

His international swansong was England's unsuccessful UEFA Euro 2000 campaign. With Shearer retiring from international football after the tournament, Adams regained the captaincy. However, within months, England lost a World Cup qualifier to Germany in October 2000, the match being the last to be staged at Wembley Stadium, before the stadium was torn down for rebuilding. That match was Adams's 60th Wembley appearance, a record. With Sven-Göran Eriksson eventually taking the helm and under increasing pressure for his place from the emerging and improving Rio Ferdinand, Adams retired from international football, having made 66 appearances, before Eriksson picked his first squad. He was the last England player to score at the old Wembley Stadium when he scored England's second goal in a 2–0 friendly win over Ukraine on 31 May 2000. This was also his first goal since he scored in a friendly against Saudi Arabia in November 1988, thus making the record for the longest gap between goals for England.

Adams was the first, and remains to date the only, England player to make tournament appearances in three separate decades.

Style of play
Described as a "stopper" (or man–marking defender) by Tom Sheen of The Guardian in 2014, Adams played as a centre-back. A tall, brave, rugged, physical, and committed defender, his main traits were his leadership, aerial prowess, and his ability to read the game and time his tackles. While initially he was not known to be the most gifted player on the ball from a technical standpoint, he developed this aspect of his game under Wenger, and he later excelled as a ball-playing centre-back, in which he became known for his ability to carry the ball out from the back, as well as his penchant for undertaking individual runs. However, he was also known for his lack of pace.

Managerial and coaching career

Wycombe Wanderers

After starting a sports science degree at Brunel University, Adams became the manager of Wycombe Wanderers on 5 November 2003. He took over the team that were in last place in the Football League Second Division (third tier). On his debut three days later, he won 4–1 at home to Swindon Town in the first round of the FA Cup. After a 2–1 loss at Tranmere Rovers on 12 April 2004 left the Chairboys 12 points inside the relegation zone with four games remaining, Adams said that his team would carry on fighting; unbeknown to the club, they were already relegated as two teams above them still had to play each other.

Wycombe began 2004–05 in the fourth tier, renamed League Two. Although the club were top of the table in August 2004, a loss of form saw them fall down the table. Adams resigned from Wycombe on 9 November 2004, with the club in 17th, citing personal reasons.

Feyenoord

In July 2005, Adams accepted a trainee coaching role with Dutch side Feyenoord with special responsibility for its Jong team, which is a reserve/junior side. Adams later had a short spell seconded to Utrecht as a first team trainee coach in January and February 2006. While at Feyenoord he also worked part-time as a scout for Arsenal, watching games in Italy, France and the Netherlands.

Portsmouth

Adams joined Portsmouth as assistant manager to Harry Redknapp in June 2006, a position left vacant by the departure of Kevin Bond. In his first season as assistant, Portsmouth finished ninth in the Premier League – their highest standing since the 1950s and won the 2007–08 FA Cup. Adams was appointed caretaker manager of Portsmouth in October 2008, alongside Joe Jordan, following the departure of Harry Redknapp to Tottenham Hotspur. He was subsequently appointed full-time manager. He was sacked in February 2009 after just 16 games in charge in which Portsmouth picked up only 10 points.

Gabala

In May 2010, Adams signed a three-year contract to manage Azerbaijani club Gabala FC of the Azerbaijan Premier League. He departed as coach of Gabala due on 16 November 2011, before the end of the 2011–12 season.

In October 2012, Adams returned to Gabala in the capacity of Sporting Director.

Granada
On 10 April 2017, Adams was named as manager of La Liga strugglers Granada CF until the end of the 2016–17 season. At the end of the season, Granada were relegated from La Liga ending their six-year stay in the top division. Adams lost all seven games as manager and was subsequently sacked.

Career statistics

Club

International goals
Scores and results list England's goal tally first, score column indicates score after each Adams goal.

Managerial statistics

Charitable work
In September 2000, as a result of his own experiences with alcoholism and drug addiction, Adams founded the Sporting Chance Clinic, a charitable foundation aimed at providing treatment, counselling and support for sports men and women suffering from drink, drug or gambling addictions. The clinic, which works to the twelve-step programme philosophy of Alcoholics Anonymous is based near Liphook in Hampshire and includes Kate Hoey, Alex Rae and Elton John as patrons, and is supported by the Professional Footballers' Association. Adams's former Arsenal and England teammate Paul Merson, himself a recovering alcoholic, is also a patron of the charity.

His Arsenal testimonial match helped raise £500,000 for his charity, the Sporting Chance Clinic.

Adams is a Patron for NACOA—a charity that provides information, advice and support for anyone affected by their parents' drinking. He is also a Patron for charity School-Home Support (SHS). SHS helps disadvantaged children and young people overcome barriers to education such as poverty, domestic abuse and housing issues.

Post-football career
Adams remains a popular figure with Arsenal fans. In December 2008, more than six years after he left the club, Adams led out his Portsmouth side onto the pitch at Arsenal to be greeted with the chant "There's only one Tony Adams" by Arsenal fans.

On 30 December 2009, Adams was the guest editor on BBC Radio 4's Today programme.

In 2015, Adams underwent heart surgery after suffering from chest pains. After the operation, he stated that it had probably saved his life.

In December 2018, Adams was named as the 29th President of the Rugby Football League from summer 2019, replacing politician Andy Burnham; he was succeeded in the honorary role by broadcaster Clare Balding a year later.

In 2022, he took part as a celebrity contestant in the twentieth series of Strictly Come Dancing being partnered by dance professional Katya Jones.

In popular culture
In the 1997 motion picture The Full Monty, Horse (played by Paul Barber) specifically mentions Adams while attempting to explain that a particular part in their dance routine was similar to the "Arsenal offside trap."
In the debut album Rock Art and the X-Ray Style by Joe Strummer and the Mescaleros, the opening track is named 'Tony Adams'.
"Ali in the Jungle", a song by the English rock band The Hours, refers to him in its lyrics.
In Robert Muchamore's CHERUB series, protagonist James Adams chooses the middle name Anthony and last name Adams after Tony Adams when he joins CHERUB.

Honours
Arsenal
 Football League First Division/Premier League: 1988–89, 1990–91, 1997–98, 2001–02
 FA Cup: 1992–93, 1997–98, 2001–02
 Football League Cup: 1986–87, 1992–93
 Football League Centenary Trophy: 1988
 FA Charity Shield: 1991, 1998
 European Cup Winners' Cup: 1993–94;

Individual
 Arsenal Player of the Season: 1986−87, 1989−90, 1993−94
 PFA Young Player of the Year: 1986–87
 PFA First Division/Premier League Team of the Year: 1986–87, 1993–94, 1995–96, 1996–97
 PFA Team of the Century (1907–2007):
 Team of the Century 1997–2007
 Overall Team of the Century
 Premier League 10 Seasons Awards: (1992–93 – 2001–02)
 Domestic Team of the Decade
 Overall Team of the Decade
 Premier League 20 Seasons Awards: (1992–93 – 2011–12)
 Public choice Fantasy Teams of the 20 Seasons
 Panel choice Fantasy Teams of the 20 Seasons
 English Football Hall of Fame: 2004
 Football League 100 Legends

Orders
 Member in The Most Excellent Order of the British Empire (MBE): (1999 Birthday Honours)

See also
List of footballers in England by number of league appearances (500+)
List of one-club men

Footnotes

References
General
Adams, Tony. Addicted. (London: CollinsWillow, 1998) 

Specific

External links

Sporting Chance
Tony Adams at The Highbury Inn

1966 births
Living people
Footballers from Romford
English footballers
Association football central defenders
Arsenal F.C. players
English Football League players
Premier League players
England under-21 international footballers
England B international footballers
England international footballers
UEFA Euro 1988 players
UEFA Euro 1996 players
1998 FIFA World Cup players
UEFA Euro 2000 players
English Football Hall of Fame inductees
English football managers
Wycombe Wanderers F.C. managers
Portsmouth F.C. managers
Gabala FC managers
Granada CF managers
English Football League managers
Premier League managers
La Liga managers
English expatriate football managers
English expatriate sportspeople in Azerbaijan
English expatriate sportspeople in Spain
Expatriate football managers in Azerbaijan
Expatriate football managers in Spain
Members of the Order of the British Empire
Sportspeople convicted of crimes
FA Cup Final players
Association football coaches
Association football scouts
Arsenal F.C. non-playing staff
Feyenoord non-playing staff
FC Utrecht non-playing staff